Sara Kishon (October 8, 1931 – March 24, 2002) was a pianist, art collector, and the wife of the Israeli author and satirist Ephraim Kishon.

Biography
Sara was a graduate of the Juilliard School in New York with a Master's in Music and Piano.

Ephraim and Sara Kishon got married in 1959. Sara Kishon was known in Kishon's books as the "Little Woman" or "The Best Wife of All". Sara was a significant driving force in Ephraim Kishon's career and international success. Sara is the mother of Amir and Renana Kishon.

In 1975, Sara and Ephraim Kishon established  The Kishon Gallery. It quickly became a leading gallery in its field, participating in many art fairs in Europe. In 2009 the gallery was renovated with additional space for contemporary art emphasizing fresh, young, cultural activity in a meticulous exhibition space by daughter Renana Kishon.

In 1998, Sara Kishon published her first book, gathering her favorite Kishon's stories in one book, with her comments and stories.

References

External links 
 kishongallery.com
 juilliard.edu

2002 deaths
1931 births
Israeli pianists
Israeli women pianists
Israeli Jews
People from Tel Aviv
Israeli art collectors
Israeli writers
Israeli women writers
Juilliard School alumni
Israeli expatriates in the United States
20th-century Israeli pianists
20th-century women pianists